Sir Scrope Bernard-Morland, 4th Baronet (1 October 1758 – 18 April 1830) was a British politician and baronet.

Background
Born Scrope Bernard in Pestel Amberg in New Jersey, he was the sixth and youngest son of Sir Francis Bernard, 1st Baronet and Amelia Offley, daughter of Stephen Offley. In 1818, he succeeded his older brother Thomas as baronet. Bernard-Morland was educated at Harrow School and Christ Church, Oxford. He graduated as a Bachelor of Arts in 1779 and was promoted by seniority to Master of Arts two years later. 

In 1788, he was awarded the degree of Doctor of Civil Laws (DCL). One year later, Bernard-Morland became a member of the College of Laws in London, and in 1795, he was promoted Judge of the Episcopal Court of Durham. In 1811, by Royal Licence, he assumed the surname of Bernard-Morland to inherit the estates of his father-in-law.

Career
In 1782, Bernard-Morland was appointed Private Secretary to the Lord Lieutenant of Ireland, an office he held until 1787. He was Secretary to the Commission of Enquiry into Public Offices in 1785 and Gentleman Usher of the Black Rod in Ireland in 1787. Between 1789 and 1792, he was Under-Secretary of State for the Home Department. Bernard-Morland entered the British House of Commons for Aylesbury in 1789. He represented the constituency first in the Parliament of Great Britain then in the Parliament of the United Kingdom until 1802. Subsequently, he sat as Member of Parliament for St Mawes from 1806 until 1808 and again from 1809 to his death in 1830.

Family
On 26 July 1785, he married Harriett Morland, the only daughter of William Morland, at St George's, Hanover Square, in Westminster. They had seven children, five sons and two daughters. Bernard-Morland died at his home in Pall Mall, London, aged 71 and was buried in Great Kimble in Buckinghamshire, where he owned an extensive estate. He was succeeded in the baronetcy successively by his third son Francis and then his fourth son Thomas.

References

External links

1758 births
1830 deaths
Alumni of Christ Church, Oxford
Baronets in the Baronetage of Great Britain
British MPs 1784–1790
British MPs 1790–1796
British MPs 1796–1800
Members of the Parliament of Great Britain for English constituencies
Members of the Parliament of the United Kingdom for English constituencies
UK MPs 1806–1807
UK MPs 1807–1812
UK MPs 1812–1818
UK MPs 1818–1820
UK MPs 1820–1826
UK MPs 1826–1830
People educated at Harrow School